Lisa Larson (born 1931) is a Swedish ceramicist and designer. She is best known for her sculptures Small Zoo (1955), ABC-girls (1958), Africa (1964) and Children of the World (1974–75).

Biography

Larson was born in 1931 in Härlunda, Sweden and studied at College of Crafts and Design in Gothenburg between 1949 and 1954. She was then employed at Gustavsberg porcelain by the artistic director Stig Lindberg. Larson left Gustavsberg in 1980 to work freelance for a number of Swedish companies including Duka, Kooperativa Förbundet and Åhléns. In 1992, Larson founded the Gustavsberg Ceramic Studio with a few of her former colleagues. The studio continues to produce new designs and small scale production still takes place there.

Gallery

References

External links 

 Lisa Larson Sweden website

1931 births
Living people
20th-century Swedish artists
20th-century Swedish women artists
21st-century Swedish artists
21st-century Swedish women artists
Swedish ceramists
Swedish women designers
Swedish women ceramists
Swedish women sculptors